Ángel Alfonso Bravo Urdaneta (born August 4, 1942)  is a former Venezuelan Major League Baseball center fielder. He was signed by the Chicago White Sox as an amateur free agent before the 1963 season, and played for the White Sox (1969), Cincinnati Reds (1970–1971) and San Diego Padres (1971). A native of Maracaibo, Zulia, he batted and threw left-handed.

Bravo posted a career average of .248 (54-for-218) with one home run and 12 RBI, including 26 runs, seven doubles, three triples, and two stolen bases in 149 games played.

See also
 List of players from Venezuela in Major League Baseball

Sources

1971 Baseball Register published by The Sporting News

External links
, or Retrosheet, or Mexican League batting statistics, or Venezuelan Professional Baseball League batting statistics

1942 births
Living people
Cafeteros de Córdoba players
Chicago White Sox players
Clinton C-Sox players
Cincinnati Reds players
Dorados de Chihuahua players
Evansville White Sox players
Hawaii Islanders players
Indianapolis Indians players
Industriales de Valencia players
Lácteos de Pastora players
Leones del Caracas players
Llaneros de Portuguesa players
Major League Baseball center fielders
Major League Baseball players from Venezuela
Mexican League baseball players
Petroleros de Cabimas players
Petroleros de Zulia players
Rapiños de Occidente players
Rieleros de Aguascalientes players
San Diego Padres players
Sarasota Sun Sox players
Sportspeople from Maracaibo
Sultanes de Monterrey players
Tiburones de La Guaira players
Tidewater Tides players
Tucson Toros players
Venezuelan expatriate baseball players in Mexico
Venezuelan expatriate baseball players in the United States